Green Sea is an unincorporated community and census-designated place (CDP) in Horry County, South Carolina, United States, near the city of Loris. It was first listed as a CDP in the 2020 census with a population of 105.

History
The Green Sea post office was established 15 Feb 1870, and after a decade of being discontinued and reestablished multiple times, Richard C. Powell was appointed postmaster 8 Nov 1880, and changed the name to Powellville. The post office remained Powellville until 18 Jun 1902, when the post office changed back to Green Sea.

John P. Derham House, listed on the National Register of Historic Places in 2005, is located in Green Sea.

Demographics

2020 census

Note: the US Census treats Hispanic/Latino as an ethnic category. This table excludes Latinos from the racial categories and assigns them to a separate category. Hispanics/Latinos can be of any race.

Transportation
Green Sea owns an airport whose FAA LID is S79.

Education
Green Sea has a public library, a branch of the Horry County Memorial Library.

External links
 Green Sea Airport

References

Unincorporated communities in Horry County, South Carolina
Unincorporated communities in South Carolina
Census-designated places in Horry County, South Carolina
Census-designated places in South Carolina